Boussac may refer to:

Places in France
 Boussac, Aveyron, in the Aveyron department
 Boussac, Creuse, in the Creuse department
 , Creuse
 Boussac, Lot, in the Lot department
 La Boussac, in the Ille-et-Vilaine department
 Boussac-Bourg, in the Creuse department

People
 Marcel Boussac (1889-1980), French entrepreneur